Additional Director General of Police (ADGP) is an Indian Police Service rank. Though having the maximum possible 3-star police rank just like Director General of Police,  ADGP's are considered same to DGP's. The equivalent position or designation are Commissioner of Police of some cities like Kolkata, Chennai , Rajasthan , special or additional secretary. The  insignia of an ADG is the national emblem over a crossed sword and baton. ADG-ranked officers wear Gorget patches on their collar, which have a dark blue background with an oak leaf pattern stitched on it, similar to IGs. ADGs are now posted as the zonal heads in various Indian states. The rank below it is Inspector General of Police and the rank above it is Special Director General of Police
The ADGP is responsible for overseeing the administrative functions, law and order, investigation, modernization, intelligence, training and development of the police force. This includes managing personnel, handling transfers and promotions, and ensuring that the police force is adequately staffed and resourced.The ADGP is responsible for overseeing the investigation of major crimes and ensuring that the police force is equipped with the necessary resources and skills to conduct effective investigations.The ADGP oversees the collection and analysis of intelligence related to crime and terrorism.
Overall, the ADGP plays a critical role in ensuring that the state police force is functioning effectively and efficiently. Their responsibilities span a wide range of functions, from administrative duties to law enforcement, investigations, intelligence, training, and public relations.

See also
 Commissioner of Police
 Director General of Police
 Dinesh_MN

References

Police ranks of India
Police ranks
Three-star officers